The Blythes Are Quoted is a book completed by L. M. Montgomery (1874–1942) near the end of her life but not published in its entirety until 2009. It is her eleventh book to feature Anne Shirley Blythe, who first appears in her first and best-known novel, Anne of Green Gables (1908), and then in Anne of Avonlea (1909), Chronicles of Avonlea (1912), Anne of the Island (1915), Anne's House of Dreams (1917), Rainbow Valley (1919), Further Chronicles of Avonlea (1920), Rilla of Ingleside (1921), Anne of Windy Poplars (1936), and Anne of Ingleside (1939). It consists of an experimental blend of fifteen short stories, forty-one poems, and numerous vignettes featuring Anne and members of her family discussing her poetry. The book focuses on small-town life in Glen St. Mary, Prince Edward Island, and is divided into two halves: one preceding the events of the First World War of 1914–1918 and one relating incidents after the war, up to and including the beginning of the Second World War of 1939–1945.

Background

The Blythes Are Quoted employs an unusual structure. Short stories about residents of Glen St. Mary are interspersed with vignettes of Anne Shirley Blythe and her family discussing her poetry over a series of evenings. Before or after each of these vignettes, one or more of Anne's poems (and, later in the book, the poems of her son Walter) are presented in their entirety.

The stories themselves are not primarily about Anne or her family, though Anne and her husband, Gilbert, are at least mentioned (and often quoted) by other characters in every single story. Other members of Anne's family are also discussed upon occasion. As well, Anne has a small supporting role in one story, and Gilbert similarly has a supporting role in another. Other than the connection through Anne, however, the short stories do not narratively tie in with the poems or vignettes in any way.

The short stories, most of which were originally published in periodicals throughout the 1930s, focus on characters that live in or near Glen St. Mary, the village that Anne lives in as an adult. These previously published stories initially had no connection to Anne or to Glen St. Mary, but in compiling this volume, Montgomery rewrote the stories to change the settings and include mentions and appearances of Anne and her family, mostly in incidental roles. (Montgomery had used a similar tactic some thirty years earlier in compiling the collection Chronicles of Avonlea. In that volume, previously published stories were rewritten to mention and occasionally feature characters and settings from Anne of Green Gables.) The poems, most of which were likewise published under Montgomery's name in previous years, were now attributed to Anne and to Anne's son Walter for the purposes of this collection. The only completely new material specifically composed for this volume are the brief vignettes, which consist solely of dialogue between Anne, her family, and her housekeeper, Susan Baker.

The book returns to the characters and setting that are known to readers all around the world, but there is a noticeable shift in tone and topic, given that the book frequently deals with such matters as "adultery, illegitimacy, despair, misogyny, murder, revenge, bitterness, hatred, aging, and death."

The book was delivered to Montgomery's Canadian publisher on the day of her death in 1942, but for reasons unexplained, the publisher declined to issue the book at the time. Montgomery scholar Elizabeth Rollins Epperly speculates that the book's dark tone and anti-war message (Anne speaks very bitterly of the Second World War in one passage) may have made the volume unpublishable in the midst of the patriotic fervour surrounding the second world war.

Publication history

An abridged version of this book was published as a collection of short stories called The Road to Yesterday in 1974, more than thirty years after the original work had been submitted. The Road to Yesterday shortened and reorganized the stories (dropping one story entirely) and omitted all the vignettes and all but one of the poems. A paperback edition of The Road to Yesterday was published in both Canada and the U.S. in 1993.

On 8 April 2009, Montgomery scholar Benjamin Lefebvre announced that his edition of The Blythes Are Quoted, would be published by Viking Canada in October 2009, sixty-seven years after it had been completed. This edition contained the full text of Montgomery's final typescript and made only minimal changes to spelling and punctuation for clarity. Lefebvre also contributed an afterword to the volume, which also includes a foreword by Elizabeth Rollins Epperly. A paperback edition appeared in October 2010.

The volume has likewise appeared in translation. A Finnish edition, Annan jäähyväiset (literally Anne's Farewell), translated by Marja Helanen-Ahtola, was published by Werner Söderström Osakeyhtiö in September 2010. A Polish edition, Ania z Wyspy Ksiecia Edwarda (literally Anne of Prince Edward Island), translated by Pawel Ciemniewski, was published by Wydawnictwo Literackie in May 2011. A Japanese translation, An no Omoide no Hibi (literally Anne's Days of Remembrance), translated by Mie Muraoka, was published in two volumes by Shinchosha in October 2012.

On 7 February 2017, Lefebvre announced on the website for L. M. Montgomery Online that a new Penguin Modern Classics Edition of The Blythes Are Quoted would be published by Penguin Canada in October 2017. The publication date was first moved to January 9, 2018, and then to April 24, 2018, to coincide with the seventy-sixth anniversary of Montgomery's death on 24 April 1942; it was then published on July 3, 2018.

Series
Montgomery continued the story of Anne Shirley in a series of sequels. They are listed in the order of Anne's age in each novel.

References 

 Announcement: The Blythes Are Quoted (L. M. Montgomery Online)
 Penguin set to publish "new" L. M. Montgomery title (Quill & Quire)
 Lefebvre, Benjamin. "'That Abominable War!': The Blythes Are Quoted and Thoughts on L. M. Montgomery's Late Style." In Storm and Dissonance: L. M. Montgomery and Conflict, edited by Jean Mitchell, 109–30. Newcastle, UK: Cambridge Scholars Publishing, 2008.

External links
 L. M. Montgomery Online This site includes a blog, extensive lists of primary and secondary materials, detailed information about Montgomery's publishing history, and a filmography of screen adaptations of Montgomery texts; see, in particular, the page about The Blythes Are Quoted (also the book's official website)
 The Blythes Are Quoted at Benjamin Lefebvre's website
 Official Facebook page
 The Blythes Are Quoted at Penguin Random House Canada
 The Blythes Are Quoted at Goodreads
 The Blythes Are Quoted at 49th Shelf

Anne of Green Gables books
Short story collections by Lucy Maud Montgomery
Novels published posthumously
2009 short story collections
Prince Edward Island in fiction
2009 Canadian novels